Iulia Petelca (born 1 April 1999) is a Moldovan footballer who plays as a defender and has appeared for the Moldova women's national team.

Career
Petelca has been capped for the Moldova national team, appearing for the team during the UEFA Women's Euro 2021 qualifying cycle.

See also
List of Moldova women's international footballers

References

External links
 
 
 

1999 births
Living people
Moldovan women's footballers
Women's association football defenders
Moldova women's international footballers
Moldovan expatriate women's footballers
Moldovan expatriate sportspeople in Armenia
Expatriate footballers in Armenia